Andreas Leo Ateng Suripto (8 August 19426 May 2003), better known as Ateng and also known by the Chinese name Kho Tjeng Lie (邱诚烈), was a popular Indonesian actor and comedian.

Biography
Ateng was born on 8 August 1942 in Semplak, Bogor, Indonesia. His father was a merchant. He was the second child of nine children. He studied at Taman Siswa 66 Elementary School, then continued to Taman Siswa 44 Senior High School. He used to be performing at school events. He aspired to be a diplomat so that he wanted to enrolled at Akademi Hukum Militer (Military Law Academy). However he was rejected due to his dwarfism. Finally, he studied at Universitas Nasional's social and political science.

He was involved in the broadcast of RRI's Panggung Gembira hosted by Pak Kasur. Then, he became acquainted with Bing Slamet. Ateng, Slamet, and Dradjat made a comedy group Tos Kejeblos which active in 1961-1963. In 1967, Ateng, together with Eddie Sud, and Iskak and Slamet formed Kwartet Jaya.

From 1982–1988 in TVRI's Ria Jenaka, Ateng, Iskak, Suroto, and Sampan Hismanto performed as the clown servants of the hero in wayang, named Bagong, Gareng, Petruk, and Semar.

He played film since 1962. His debut film is Amor dan Humor, starring Bing Slamet and was directed by Usmar Ismail. His other films were Biji Mas, Kuntil Anak, Bing Slamet Setan Jalanan, Bing Slamet Sibuk, Bing Slamet Dukun Palsu, Ateng Minta Kawin, Ateng Sok Tahu, Ira Maya dan Kakek Ateng, Bing Slamet Koboi Cengeng, and Ateng Pendekar Aneh. He also played on Ateng Mata Keranjang, Ateng Koboi Cengeng, and Ibu Tiri Tak Sekejam Ibu Kota. Other comedy films which puts name Ateng in its title were Ateng Bikin Pusing, Ateng Sok Aksi, Ateng Pendekar Aneh, and Ateng The Godfather.

Prior to his death, he played on SCTV's comedy series titled Gregetan. Ateng died on 6 May 2003 at Mitra Internasional Hospital cause of lumps and ulcer in his throat.

Personal life
He married Theresia Maria Reni Indrawati, and had two sons named Alexander Agung Suripto and Antonius Ario Gede Suripto.

References

Bibliography

1942 births
2003 deaths
Male actors from West Java
Indonesian male film actors
Indonesian male comedians
Indonesian comedians
Indonesian Roman Catholics
Indonesian people of Chinese descent
Indonesian Hokkien people
People from Bogor
Indonesian Christians
20th-century comedians